The 2007 Nigerian Senate election in Kogi State was held on April 21, 2007, to elect members of the Nigerian Senate to represent Kogi State. Nicholas Ugbane representing Kogi East and Smart Adeyemi representing Kogi West won on the platform of Peoples Democratic Party, while Otaru Salihu Ohize representing Kogi Central won on the platform of the Action Congress.

Overview

Summary

Results

Kogi East 
The election was won by Nicholas Ugbane of the Peoples Democratic Party.

Kogi West 
The election was won by Smart Adeyemi of the Peoples Democratic Party.

Kogi Central 
The election was won by Otaru Salihu Ohize of the Action Congress.

References 

April 2007 events in Nigeria
Kogi State Senate elections
Kog